The Pinamar Open, or the Abierto de Pinamar, is a golf tournament on the TPG Tour, the official professional golf tour in Argentina. First held in 1970, it has always been held at the Links Pinamar Golf Club, in Pinamar, Buenos Aires Province. In 2010 was played the Buenos Aires Open (TPG Tour 2009).

Winners

* – won following playoff

External links
TPG Tour – official site

Golf tournaments in Argentina